David Shrayer-Petrov (Шраер-Петров, Давид) is a Russian American novelist, poet, memoirist, translator and medical scientist best known for his novel about refuseniks, Doctor Levitin, his poetry and fiction about Russian Jewish identity and his memoirs about the Soviet literary scene in the late 1950s-1970s.

Biography

Shrayer-Petrov was born of Jewish parents in Leningrad. Both of Shrayer-Petrov's parents, Petr (Peysakh) Shrayer and Bella Breydo, moved from the former Pale of Settlement to Leningrad (St. Petersburg) in the 1920s to attend college. Shrayer-Petrov spent his early prewar years in Leningrad and was evacuated from the besieged city to a village in the Ural Mountains. The future writer and his mother returned to Leningrad in the summer of 1944, his father serving as a captain, and, subsequently, a major, in a tank brigade, and, subsequently, a lieutenant commander in the Baltic Fleet.

In 1959, Shrayer-Petrov graduated from Leningrad First Medical School and subsequently served in the army as a physician. In 1966 he received a Ph.D. from the Leningrad Institute of Tuberculosis. He married Emilia Polyak (Shrayer) in 1962, and their son Maxim D. Shrayer was born in 1967, already after the family moved from Leningrad to Moscow. From 1967 to 1978 Shrayer-Petrov worked as a researcher at the Gamaleya Institute of Microbiology in Moscow. He was fired from a senior research position after his decision to apply for an exit visa. In 1979-1987 Shrayer-Petrov and his family were refuseniks and endured persecution by the Soviet authorities.

Shrayer-Petrov entered the literary scene as a poet and translator in the late 1950s. Upon the suggestion of Boris Slutsky, the poet adopted the penname David Petrov. This assimilatory gesture did not simplify the publication of Shrayer-Petrov's poetry in the Soviet Union. Most of his writings were too controversial for Soviet officialdom and remained in the writer's desk drawer or circulated in samizdat. Shrayer-Petrov's first collection of verse, Canvasses, did not appear until 1967. With great difficulty Shrayer-Petrov was admitted to the Union of Soviet Writers in 1976, upon the recommendation of Viktor Shklovsky, Lev Ozerov and Andrei Voznesensky. His poem “My Slavic Soul” brought repressive measures against the author. A Jewish refusenik expelled from the Union of Soviet Writers, Shrayer-Petrov was unable to publish in the USSR; galleys of two of his books were broken in retaliation for his decision to emigrate. In spite of bullying and arrests by the KGB, Shrayer-Petrov's last Soviet decade was productive; he wrote two novels, several plays, a memoir, and many stories and verses. He was granted permission to emigrate in 1987. Shrayer-Petrov's best-known novel, Doctor Levitin (known in Russian as Herbert and Nelly), was the first to depict the exodus of Soviet Jews and the life of refuseniks in limbo. Since the publication of its first part in Israel in 1986, Herbert and Nelly has gone through three editions, most recently in 2014 in Moscow. Its English translation appeared in 2018. After a summer in Italy, in August 1987 Shrayer-Petrov and his family arrived in Providence, RI, the home of David Shrayer-Petrov and Emilia Shrayer for the next twenty years. In Providence he worked as a medical researcher at Brown University-Roger Williams Hospital (Dr. Shrayer has published almost 100 scientific articles in microbiology and immunology). Emigration brought forth a stream of new literary works and publications. The writer and his wife currently reside in Brookline, MA, where Shrayer-Petrov devotes himself to writing full-time.

The works of David Shrayer-Petrov have been translated into English, Belarusian, Croatian, French, Hebrew, Japanese, Georgian, Lithuanian, Macedonian, Polish, and other languages.

Books in English translation
 Doctor Levitin. A Novel. 2018, Detroit, Wayne State University Press.
Dinner with Stalin and Other Stories. 2014, Syracuse, NY. Runner-up for the 2014 Edward Lewis Wallant Award.
Autumn in Yalta: A Novel and Three Stories, 2006, Syracuse, NY.
Jonah and Sarah: Jewish Stories of Russia and America, 2003, Syracuse, NY.

Books in Russian

Poetry collections
Village Orchestra (Derevenskii orkestr), six long poems, 2016, St. Petersburg, Russia.
Nevan Poems (Nevskie stithi), poetry, 2011, St. Petersburg, Russia.
Lines-Figures-Bodies: A Book of Poems (Linii-figury-tela: king stikhotvorenii), poetry, 2010, St. Petersburg, Russia.
Two Books: Poems (Dve knigi: stikhi, poetry, 2009, Philadelphia, USA.
Form of Love (Forma liubvi), poetry, 2003, Moscow, Russia.
Drums of Fortune (Barabany sud'by), poetry, 2002, Moscow, Russia.
Petersburg Doge (Piterskii dozh), poetry, 1999, St. Petersburg, Russia.
Lost Soul (Propashchaia dusha), poetry, 1997, Providence, RI, USA.
Villa Borghese (Villa Borgeze), poetry, 1992, Holyoke, MA, USA.
Song about a Blue Elephant (Pesnia o golubom slone), poetry, 1990, Holyoke, MA, USA.
Canvases (Kholsty; in the collective Pereklichka), poetry, 1967, Moscow, Russia.

Fiction
 Judin's Redemption (Iskuplenie Iudina), novel, 2021, Moscow, Russia.
 Round-the-Globe-Happiness (Krugosvetnoe shchast'e), stories, 2017, Moscow, Russia.
The Story of My Beloved, or The Spiral Staircase (Istoriia moei vozliublennoi, ii Vintovaia lestnitsa), novel, 2013, Moscow, Russia.
The Third Life (Tret'ia zhizn'), novel, 2010, Lugansk, Ukraine.
Carp for the Gefilte Fish (Karp dlia farshirovannoi ruby), stories, 2005, Moscow, Russia.
These Strange Russian Jews (Eti strannye russkie evrei), two novels, 2004, Moscow, Russia.
The Tostemaa Castle (Zamok Tystemaa), novel, 2001, Tallinn, Estonia.
The French Cottage (Frantsuzskii kottedzh), novel, 1999, Providence, RI, USA.
Herbert and Nelly (Gerbert i Nelli), novel, 1992, Moscow; 2nd ed. 2006, St. Petersburg, Russia; 3rd ed. 2014, Moscow, Russia.

Novels published serially but not in book form

Model of Life (Model' zhizni), novel, 2009-2010 (Mosty).
Judin's Redemption (Iskuplenie Iudina), novel, 2005-2006 (Mosty).
The Kissing Game (Igra v butylochku), novel, 2018-2020 (Slovo/Word).

Non-fiction
Hunt for the Red Devil: A Novel with Microbiologists (Okhota na ryzhego d'iavola: Roman s mikrobiologami), memoir, 2010, Moscow, Russia.
Vodka and Pastries: A Novel with Writers (Vodka s pirozhnymi: Roman s pisateliami), memoir-novel, 2007, St. Petersburg, Russia.
Genrikh Sapgir: Avant-Garde Classic (Genrikh Sapgir: Classic avangarda), criticism and biography, with Maxim D. Shrayer, criticism, 2004, St. Petersburg, Russia. 2nd., corrected edition St. Petersburg: Bibliorossica, 2016. 3rd, corrected edition. Ekaterinburg: Izdatel'skie resheniia; Ridero, 2017.
Gold-Domed Moscow (Moskva zlatoglavaia), memoir-novel, 1994, Baltimore, MD, USA.
Friends and Shadows (Druz'ia i teni), memoir-novel, 1989, New York, NY, USA.
Poetry of Labor Heroizm (Poeziia o trudovom geroizme), essays, 1977, Moscow, Russia.
Poetry and Science (Poeziia i nauka), essays, 1974, Moscow, Russia.

Drama
Vaccine. Ed Tenner (Vaktsina. Ed Tenner), tragicomedy in verse, 2021, Moscow, Russia.

Edited by
Genrikh Sapgir, Shorter and Longer Poems, co-edited with Maxim D. Shrayer, 2004, St. Petersburg, Russia.

References

Further reading
Books:
The Parallel Universes of David Shrayer-Petrov. A Collection Published on the Occasion of the Writer's 85th Birthday. Edited by Roman Katsman, Maxim D. Shrayer, Klavdia Smola. Boston: Academic Studies Press, 2021.
Parallel'nye vselennye Davida Shraera-Petrova. Sbornik statei i materialov k 85-letiiu pisatelia. Edited by Klavdia Smola Roman Katsman, Maxim D. Shrayer. St. Petersburg: Academic Studies Press/BiblioRossica, 2021.

Articles:

Dmitri Bobyshev. "Shraer-Petrov, David."  In Slovar' poetov russkogo zarubezh'ia, edited by Vadim Kreyd et al.  St. Petersburg: Izdatel'stvo russkogo khristianskogo gumanitarnogo instituta, 1999. 432-34.
Roman Katsman. Jewish Fearless Speech: Towards a Definition of Soviet Jewish Nonconformism. East European Jewish Affairs 48:1 (2018): 41-55.
Irena Luksic. Razgovor: David Srajer-Petrov. Zivot u tri dimenzije. Vijenac 20 May 1999.
Penny Schwartz. 40 Years Ago, a Refusenik Made Art of the Soviet Jewish Tragedy. Jewish Telegraph Agency 18 December 2018.
Mark Shechner. Dinner with Stalin and Other Stories, by David Shrayer-Petrov. Ericadreifus.com 17 August 2014 
Maxim D. Shrayer. Afterword: Voices of My Father's Exile. In: Autumn in Yalta: A Novel and Three Stories, by David Shrayer-Petrov. Edited, cotranslated, and with an afterword by Maxim D. Shrayer. Syracuse: Syracuse University Press, 2006. 205-234.
Maxim D. Shrayer. Afterword: David Shrayer-Petrov, a Jewish Writer in Russia and America." In: David Shrayer-Petrov.  Jonah and Sarah: Jewish Stories of Russia and America. Ed. Maxim D. Shrayer. Syracuse: Syracuse University Press, 2003. (Library of Modern Jewish Literature). 173-181.
Maxim D. Shrayer. Shrayer-Petrov, David. In: Jewish Writers of the Twentieth Century. Ed. Sorrell Kerbel. New-York-London: Fitzroy Dearborn Publishers, 2003. 534-535.
Maxim D. Shrayer. David Shrayer-Petrov. An Anthology of Jewish-Russian Literature: Two Centuries of Dual Identity in Prose and Poetry, 1801–2001, 2 vol. Armonk, NY: M. E. Sharpe, 2007. 1056-1062.
Klavdia Smola. O prose russko-evreiskogo pisatelia Davida Shraera-Petrova. In: Russian Jews in America. Book 15. Compiled and edited by Ernst Zaltsberg. Toronto-St. Petersburg, 2017. 135-50.
Klavdia Smola. “Das Martyrium des Otkaz: David Šraer-Petrovs „Gerbert i Nėlli.“” In: K. Smola.  Wiedererfindung der Tradition: Russisch-jüdische Literatur der Gegenwart. Wien: Böhlau-Verlag, 2019. 139-148.
Victor Terras.  Rev. of Druz'ia i ten, by David Shrayer-Petrov. World Literature Today 64. 1 (1990): 148.
Victor Terras.  Rev. of Moskva zlatoglavaia, by David Shrayer-Petrov. World Literature Today 69. 2 (1995): 388-399.

Sources
David Shrayer-Petrov in "Encyclopedia of Russian America"
David Shrayer-Petrov and Maxim D. Shrayer, "Dinner with Stalin: Parts 1-3," Jewish Book Council July 2014
David Reich, "Destiny: A Poet Writes in His Father's Voice," Boston College Magazine, Fall 2003
David Mehegan, "Russia to Rhode Island," Off the Shelf/The Boston Globe, February 8, 2008
Alice Nakhimovsky, "Russian Literature," "The YIVO Encyclopedia of Jews in Eastern Europe"
David Shrayer-Petrov reads from and discusses his works at Bar-Ilan University (2012)

Russian memoirists
Refuseniks
20th-century Russian poets
Jewish Russian writers
Russian male poets
Russian refugees
Jewish refugees
Russian male short story writers
English–Russian translators
Translators from English
American people of Russian-Jewish descent
Jewish American writers
Shrayer-Petov
Russian emigrants to the United States
1936 births
Living people
American writers of Russian descent
Soviet Jews
Russian medical researchers
American medical researchers
20th-century Russian translators
21st-century Russian poets
20th-century Russian male writers
21st-century male writers
Employees of the Gamaleya Research Institute of Epidemiology and Microbiology
21st-century American Jews